Las Anod International Airport  is an airstrip northwest of the city of Las Anod, the capital of Sool region in Somaliland.

History
In the 2010s, controversies have occurred at Las Anod airport, including over the importation of Khat, a leaf stimulant, and fighting between Dhulbahante subclans.

Location

See also
Transport in Somaliland
List of airports in Somaliland

References

External links
OpenStreetMap - Las Anod Airport

Airports in Somaliland